In grammar, the sociative case is a grammatical case in the Hungarian, Tamil, and Malayalam languages that can express the person in whose company (cf. Latin ) an action is carried out, or to any belongings of people which take part in an action (together with their owners).

Hungarian
In Hungarian, this case is denoted by the suffixes -stul and -stül, depending on vowel harmony. This case is archaic and nowadays the instrumental-comitative case is usually used instead. Nevertheless, it can be used also in modern Hungarian to express a slight pejorative tone against a person. Here are a few examples:

 Karácsonykor egy fillér nélkül, kölyköstül állított be az anyósához "Without a dime, she wound up in her mother-in-law's house at Christmas with her kids"

The use of the sociative case kölyköstül ("with her kids") signifies the speaker's contempt. The case appears also in some commonly used expressions, which survived the general obsolescence of the sociative case:

 Ruhástul ugrott a medencébe "He jumped into the pool with his clothes on"
 A fenevad szőröstül-bőröstül felfalta a védtelen kis nyuszit "The monster devoured the helpless little bunny neck and crop"

Tamil
It is related to the instrumental case but not identical to it. In contrast to the sociative case, the instrumental case usually denotes the means of action and takes the ending .

External links 
 Hungarian Gyerekestül versus Gyerekkel (‘with [the] kid’) by Fekete, István
 The Tamil Case System, by Harold F. Schiffman

Grammatical cases
Hungarian grammar